The Sea Will Claim Everything is a point-and-click adventure game,  the first commercial video game from design team Jonas and Verena Kyratzes. Written by Jonas Kyratzes with graphics from Verena Kyratzes, it is the fourth game in their Lands of Dream series and was released May 25, 2012. It features a musical score by Chris Christodoulou. The game is available from the author's website and has occasionally been bundled with other games from various digital download portals. It was released on Steam on March 24, 2016.

Reception
According to Metacritic, PC Master and GameOver.gr favorably reviewed the game. PC Master speaks of an "unbelievable, beautiful, emotionally charged adventure" and "an unforgettable, dreamy journey that every adventure-gamer should experience". GameOver.gr notes the slow pacing rhythm of the game, asking the player to immerse themselves in the game to enjoy it and salutes "an excellent narrative, a beautiful art style, and wonderful music that trigger all kinds of memories of dreams we've forgotten or we never knew we had".

For Rock, Paper, Shotgun, the game emphasizes in the quality of the text and the narrative, which sometimes could overload the player.

The Sea Will Claim Everything was nominated at the Telegraph video game awards 2012 for the Best Original Script. It has been included in the IndieGames.com's best of the year lists, at the second position for indie adventure games and twelfth in the overall top.

References

External links
 Official website

Adventure games
Video games developed in Germany
Windows games
Windows-only games
2012 video games